As Husbands Go is a 1934 American pre-Code comedy film directed by Hamilton MacFadden and written by S. N. Behrman and Sonya Levien. It is based on the 1931 play As Husbands Go by Rachel Crothers. The film stars Warner Baxter, Helen Vinson, Warner Oland, Catherine Doucet, G. P. Huntley, Frank O'Connor, and Eleanor Lynn. The film was released on January 27, 1934, by Fox Film Corporation.

Plot

Cast    
Warner Baxter as Charles Lingard
Helen Vinson as Lucille Lingard
Warner Oland as Hippolitus Lomi
Catherine Doucet as Emmie Sykes
G. P. Huntley as Ronald Derbyshire
Frank O'Connor as Jake Canon
Eleanor Lynn as Peggy Sykes
Jay Ward as Wilbur

References

External links
 

1934 films
American comedy films
1934 comedy films
Fox Film films
Films directed by Hamilton MacFadden
American black-and-white films
1930s English-language films
1930s American films